The Crofts Baronetcy, of Stow in the County of Suffolk, is a title in the Baronetage of England. It was created on 16 March 1661 for John Crofts.

William Crofts, 1st Baron Crofts, was the cousin of the first Baronet.

Crofts baronets, of Stow (1661)
Sir John Crofts, 1st Baronet (1635–1664)

References

Extinct baronetcies in the Baronetage of England
1661 establishments in England